Hygelac (or Hugilaicus; died  521) was a king of the Geats according to the poem Beowulf.  It is Hygelac's presence in the poem which has allowed scholars to tentatively date the setting of the poem as well as to infer that it contains at least some points of historical fact. Beowulf gives Hygelac's genealogy: according to the poem, he was the son of Hrethel and had two brothers Herebeald and Hæþcyn, as well as an unnamed sister who was married to Ecgtheow and was the mother of the hero Beowulf.  Hygelac was married to Hygd, and they had a son Heardred and an unnamed daughter who married Eofor. When Hygelac's brother Hæþcyn was fighting with the Swedes, Hygelac arrived at Hrefnesholt one day too late to save his brother Hæþcyn, but he managed to rescue the surviving Geatish warriors, who were besieged by the Swedish king Ongentheow and his three sons. The Swedes found refuge at a hill fort but were assaulted by the Geats. In the battle, the Swedish king was slain by Eofor. After the death of his brother Herebeald, Hygelac ascended the Geatish throne. After he was killed during a raid on Frisia (by a grandson of Clovis I), Hygelac was succeeded by Heardred, according to Beowulf.

The raid to Frisia enabled N. F. S. Grundtvig to approximate the date of Hygelac's death to c. 516, because a raid to France under a King Chlochilaicus, king of the Danes, is mentioned by Gregory of Tours. In that source he is recorded as invading the Frankish Kingdoms during the reign of Theodericus I (died 534), the son of Clovis ("Chlodovechus"), the king of the Franks in the early sixth century, and was killed in the ensuing chaos after the Scandinavian raiders were caught by the sudden appearance of a military response force led by Theodebertus, the son of Theodericus. Gregory of Tours calls this king Chlochilaicus Danish. He is called the king of Getae (rex Getarum) in the Liber Monstrorum and king of the Goths (rege Gotorum) in Liber historiae Francorum. After cutting the Geatish danger, the rest of the survivors took to sea in such disordered haste that they left their dead on the field, including their king. The Franks must have taken back whatever had been taken in pillage as well as spoils of the battlefield; and it is reported by Gregory that they found the Scandinavian monarch (Hygelac)'s corpse so awe-inspiring due his extraordinary height—which is implied by his name, perhaps a sobriquet like Longshanks (Edward I) and not his real one—that as a pagan barbarian not entitled to burial, his remains were exposed for a long time in the nearest Merovingian Court as a curiosity, following the usual triumphal trophy exhibition customary after battle or pirate captures.

There are two theories on how the account of Chlochilaicus' raid came to be preserved in the epic Beowulf, and they have a bearing upon the date assigned to the poem. It may date to the early 8th century, but some have suggested that it was composed as late as the 10th century, the date of the sole surviving manuscript. One view considers the account to have kept alive by the oral tradition of heroic poetry until it was included in the epos. It has also been suggested that the poem is dependent on Liber historiae Francorum (727), because it mentions the Attoarii, which in Beowulf become Hetware. One scholar considers it to be inconceivable that independent oral tradition would have faithfully transmitted such a detail. Walter Goffart estimated that Beowulf could not have been written with these historical details before 923.

See also
 Hugleik
 Chlochilaicus

Sources and notes

Further reading
 

Characters in Beowulf
English heroic legends
Kings of the Geats
Germanic warriors
6th-century monarchs in Europe